Gaupara is a village situated in Puthia Upazila, Rajshahi District, Bangladesh. It is a very famous village with a population of around 1000. There is a primary school in the village named Gaopara Govt. Primary School. There is also a high school in the village. It is situated by the great highway between Dhaka and Rajshahi, the busiest highway of the country. There is a local market situated in the village called Dhalan Bazar.

References

Populated places in Rajshahi District